Emilia Wcisło (born 30 July 1942 in Rzeszow, General Government) was a Polish politician, Members of the Sejm of the Polish People's Republic (1985–89).

Awards and decorations
1989: Knight's Cross of the Order of Polonia Restituta (PRL)
Gold  Cross of Merit
Silver Cross of Merit

References

1942 births
Living people
People from Rzeszów
People from the General Government
Alliance of Democrats (Poland) politicians
Members of the Polish Sejm 1985–1989
Women members of the Sejm of the Polish People's Republic
Maria Curie-Skłodowska University alumni
Knights of the Order of Polonia Restituta